The Murchison River, part of the Pieman River catchment, is a major perennial river located in the West Coast region of Tasmania, Australia.

Course and features
The Murchison River rises below Pyramid Mountain, part of the north eastern section of the West Coast Range within the Cradle Mountain-Lake St Clair National Park. The river flows generally northwest, joined by six tributaries including the Wallace, Achilles, Bluff, and Anthony rivers and flowing through the impoundment, Lake Murchison. The river reaches its confluence with the Mackintosh River to form the Pieman River near  in what is now Lake Rosebery, formed by the impounding of the Pieman by the Bastyan Dam.

The river catchment easternmost point can be located at Mount Pelion West, while the junction point in the river catchments of the Mackintosh River and the Murchison can be located at Barn Bluff. The catchment is bordered to the south by the Eldon Range, and its south western area is in the West Coast Range, with the Tyndall Range and Lake Rolleston on its south west border.

The Murchison River forms part of the Pieman River Power Development scheme. The Murchison Dam across the Murchison River was constructed in the 1980s by Hydro Tasmania. The dame forms the narrow Lake Murchison  that lies east of Mount Murchison. Water from the dam is fed through the Sophia Tunnel into Lake Mackintosh for hydroelectric power generation.

See also

 List of rivers of Tasmania
 Rivers of Tasmania
 Mackintosh Power Station

References

External links

Rivers of Tasmania
Pieman River Power Development